Þorsteinn Gauti Hjálmarsson is an Icelandic-Finnish handball player who currently plays for Fram of the Icelandic top-tier Úrvalsdeild karla. In December 2022, he was called into the Finnish national handball team training group.

Personal life
Þorsteinn holds a dual Icelandic-Finnish citizenship due to his grandmother being born in Finland.

References

External links
EHF profile

1995 births
Living people
Finnish male handball players
Þorsteinn Gauti Hjálmarsson